The Sunlight Dialogues is a 1972 novel by the American author John Gardner.

Plot summary
The novel is set in the 1960s in Batavia, New York. It follows Batavia police chief Fred Clumly in his pursuit of a magician known as the Sunlight Man, a champion of existential freedom and pre-biblical Babylonian philosophy.  As Clumly believes in absolute law, order, justice and a Judeo-Christian world view, the two butt their ideological heads in a number of dialogues, all recorded on audiocassette by Clumly.  Each of these two characters attempts to exert power over the other—Clumly with the law behind him and the Sunlight Man with his magic and violence—until they wear down not only each other, but many of the other characters with whom they come into contact.  A myriad of side-stories provides background for the plot.

Characters in "The Sunlight Dialogues"
Fred Clumly
Esther Clumly
The Sunlight Man
Domenic "Miller" Sangirgonio
Stan Kozlowski
Will Hodge, Sr.
Mildred Jewel
Will Hodge, Jr.
Luke Hodge
Ben Hodge
Vanessa Woodchurch

Kathleen Paxton
Clive Paxton
Nick Slater
Vernon Slater
Mickey Salvador
John Figlow
R.V. Kleppmann
Mrs. Kleppmann
Walter Benson/Boyle
Marguerite Benson
Oliver Nuper

Critical response

References

External links
 

Novels by John Gardner (American writer)
1972 American novels
American philosophical novels
Alfred A. Knopf books
Novels set in New York (state)
Batavia, New York
Fiction set in the 1960s